Frank Ryan (October 5th, 1900 – July 17th, 1965) was an Irish tenor born in Fermoy, County Cork, Ireland in October 1900.

His family moved to Tallow, County Waterford, Ireland when Frank was six years old; and his parents began a victualing business. His voice developed late, and after it was discovered in his mid-20s that he was a tenor, he won the Tenor Solo award at the Dublin Feis Ceoil in 1931 and the Feis Matthew on four occasions. He joined the Fermoy Choral Society in 1935 and took leading roles in The Gondoliers, Pirates of Penzance, The Geisha, The Yeomen of the Guard, H.M.S. Pinafore, The Mikado and in later years, Lilac Time.

When Frank Ryan competed for the Joseph O'Mara cup at the Dublin Feis Ceoil in 1938, he was commended by the adjudicator, Topliss Green, for his beautiful yet untrained voice:

He turned professional when he joined the Dublin Operatic Society in 1939 and sang leading roles in Faust, Maritana, The Bohemian Girl, Ernani, The Magic Flute, The Lily of Killarney, Martha, Cavalleria rusticana and La bohème. He sang with famous leading ladies of the time such as Elena Danelli, Lena Menova, Joan Hammond, Marion Studholme and Marian Lowe. He traveled extensively, appearing in London (Albert Hall, Royal Festival Hall, Seymour Hall), Glasgow, Belgium, Italy, France, Malta, and the United States. He gave many concerts all over the States including The Royal Academy, Brooklyn, and a full recital in Carnegie Hall, New York City, where he sang 32 songs.

He appeared regularly on Radio Éireann, BBC and RTÉ. His last public performance was in Fermoy, County Cork, Ireland on 29 June 1965, just three weeks before he died on 17 July 1965, aged 64.

Notes 

1900 births
1965 deaths
Irish operatic tenors
Musicians from County Waterford
20th-century Irish male opera singers